Qingmenodus is a genus of prehistoric lobe-finned fish. Fossils of Qingmenodus were found in China and date back to the Early Devonian period. Qingmenodus reveals the first well-ossified otoccipital braincase in onychodonts. Palaeontologists believe that Qingmenodus was one of the oldest onychodont fish.

Relationships

A study of additional new fossils of Qingmenodus in a larger phylogenetic analysis of Sarcopterygii including new neurocranial characters supported placing onychodontiforms as stem-coelacanths, within Actinistia.

References

Onychodontida
Prehistoric lobe-finned fish genera
Devonian bony fish
Early Devonian fish
Devonian fish of Asia
Fossil taxa described in 2010